All Saints Church is a Church of England parish church in Tooting, Wandsworth, Greater London. The church was designed by Temple Moore and is a grade II listed building.

History
Having been designed by Temple Moore, the church was built between 1903 and 1906. Due to a conflict between Temple Moore and the first incumbent, the interior decoration was overseen by Walter Tapper. The church was consecrated in 1907. It is Gothic Revival in style. The church consists of a nave with double aisles, a north tower, an aisled chancel, and an eastern Lady Chapel.

On 14 July 1955, the church was designated a grade II listed building.

The church is notable for its fine acoustic and outstanding three-manual Harrison and Harrison organ of 1906.  In 2014 the organ was awarded Grade II* listing with the National Pipe Organ Register.  The church also houses a fine chamber organ built by Osmond of Taunton, circa 1966 (owned by Ben Costello, but on long-term loan).  There is also a Yamaha baby grand piano suitable for concert use.  The Director of Music is Emma Howarth.  Many significant recordings were made at the church during the 1980s and 1990s, and the album A Garland for Linda was recorded at All Saints in 1999.

Present day
The parish of All Saints, Tooting is part of the Archdeaconry of Wandsworth in the Diocese of Southwark.

Notable people
 Nicholas Frayling, later Dean of Chichester, was vicar from 1974 to 1983
 Peter Maurice, later Bishop of Taunton, was vicar from 1996 to 2003
 Graham Smith, later Dean of Norwich, served his curacy here
 Christopher Pullin, Canon Chancellor of Hereford Cathedral, served his curacy here

Gallery

References

External links
 Parish website
 A Church Near You entry

Church of England church buildings in the London Borough of Wandsworth
Tooting
Grade II listed buildings in the London Borough of Wandsworth
Grade II listed churches in London
Temple Moore buildings
Tooting
Churches completed in 1906
20th-century Church of England church buildings
1906 establishments in England